Castel Viscardo is a comune (municipality) in the Province of Terni in the Italian region Umbria,
 
The town lies about 60 km southwest of Perugia and about 35 km northeast of Terni. 

Castel Viscardo borders the following municipalities: Acquapendente, Allerona, Castel Giorgio, Orvieto.

Frazioni

Monterubiaglio is a paesello, a small hilltop village, below Castel Viscardo. The name Monterubiaglio literally means "red garlic mountain". Monterubiaglio has approximately 600 inhabitants, but during the summer time the population grows much larger as it is a popular vacation spot for persons who are originally from the village but may have moved elsewhere such as Rome.

Since 2006, the Department of Classics at Saint Anselm College has been excavating an Etrusco-Romano site just below Monterubiaglio.  The excavation has yielded a number of  finds and structures that date from the 8th century BCE to the 10th CE. 

Local agriculture is a primary industry, particular viticulture, and its production is part of the Orvieto wine-producing region, which is best known for the white wine Orvieto Classico. Lately, however, some wine growers have produced a new label "Monrubio", which is a red wine.

References

External links
 Official website

Cities and towns in Umbria